Gods of Violence is the fourteenth studio album by German thrash metal band Kreator, released on 27 January 2017. This is Kreator's final studio album with bassist Christian "Speesy" Giesler before his departure from the band in 2019.

Background
It was the band's first studio album in almost five years since 2012's Phantom Antichrist, marking the longest gap between two studio albums, until Hate Über Alles broke this record in 2022. A music video for the album's title track was released on 18 November 2016. Special editions of the album were released with a bonus Blu-ray/DVD of Kreator's performance at Wacken 2014.

Reception 

Gods of Violence received positive reviews upon its release. Writing for All About the Rock, Fraser Wilson said: "With this record, Kreator have created a slab of truly eviscerating aural perfection. Thrash may have been born in San Francisco's Bay Area, but it was perfected in Essen."

Gods of Violence debuted at number one on the German charts, making it Kreator's first number one debut in their 32-year recording career. The album won a 2017 Metal Storm Award for Best Thrash Metal Album.

Track listing

Credits 
Writing, performance and production credits are adapted from the album liner notes.

Kreator
 Mille Petrozza – vocals, rhythm guitar
 Sami Yli-Sirniö – lead guitar
 Christian Giesler – bass
 Ventor – drums

Additional musicians
 Boris Pfeiffer (In Extremo) – bagpipes on "Hails to the Hordes"
 Tekla-Li Wadensten – harp; intro piece on "Gods of Violence"
 Dagobert Jäger – German vocals on "Fallen Brother"

Choir
 Ronny Milianowicz
 Björn Kromm
 Frederik Eriksson
 Henrik Andersoon
 Mattias Lövdahl
 Lars Höjer
 Jens Bogren

Arrangements
 Kreator – arrangement
 Francesco Paoli – orchestral arrangement
 Francesco Ferrini – orchestral arrangement

Production
 Jens Bogren – production, recording, mixing
 David Castillo – additional engineering
 Erik Mjörnell – additional engineering
 Christoffer Wadensten – engineering (harp only)
 Ronny Milianowicz – recording (choir only)
 Ludwig Näsvall – drumtech
 Urban Näsvall – drumtech
 Linus Corneliusson – mixing assistance, editing
 Tony Lindgren – mastering
 Olman Viper – mastering
 Marc Görtz (Caliban) – pre-production
 Dominic Paraskevopoulos – Pre-production

Studios
 Fascination Street Studios, Sweden – production, recording, mixing, mastering
 Studio Seven, Örebro, Sweden – recording (choir only)
 Nemesis Studios, Germany – pre-production
 Level 3 – pre-production
 Hertzwerk, Hamburg, Germany – mastering

Charts

References 

2017 albums
Kreator albums
Nuclear Blast albums
Albums produced by Jens Bogren